The Apostolic Nunciature to Jordan is an ecclesiastical office of the Catholic Church in Jordan. It is a diplomatic post of the Holy See, whose representative is called the Apostolic Nuncio with the rank of an ambassador.

Apostolic Nuncios to Jordan
 Giuseppe Lazzarotto (23 July 1994 – 11 November 2000)
 Fernando Filoni (17 January 2001 – 25 February 2006)
 Francis Assisi Chullikatt (29 April 2006 – 17 July 2010)
 Giorgio Lingua (4 September 2010 – 17 March 2015)
 Alberto Ortega Martín (1 August 2015 – 7 October 2019)
 Giovanni Pietro Dal Toso (21 January 2023 – present)

See also
Foreign relations of the Holy See
List of diplomatic missions of the Holy See

References

Jordan